John Patrick Thomson (born Patrick Francis McAleer; 2 April 1969) is an English comedian, narrator and actor best known for his roles in The Fast Show, Men Behaving Badly, Cold Feet, 24 Hour Party People, The Brothers Grimsby and Coronation Street.

Early life
Thomson was born in 1969 in Walkden, Worsley, Lancashire, to Mary McAleer, who gave him up for adoption six weeks later. He was adopted from the Catholic Children's Rescue Society by Andrew and Marita Thomson, a businessman and a bookseller from Didsbury. He has one younger brother, Ben (born to his adoptive parents). He attended All Hallows Catholic High School near Preston, Lancashire, leaving with three O-levels. He then attended Runshaw College between 1985 and 1987, studying for four A-levels, including theatre studies. He was described as "clearly [having] a talent for comedy".

Following this, he turned down a scholarship in America, to study drama at Manchester Polytechnic instead.

Career

Comedy and television
While at university, Thomson met Steve Coogan, who secured him a job on Spitting Image. They would continue to collaborate on such programmes as The Dead Good Show, a 1993 Granada TV pilot also starring Caroline Aherne, Coogan's Run, the Paul and Pauline Calf video diaries (where he played 'Fat Bob') and Knowing Me, Knowing You... with Alan Partridge, which he also contributed to writing. He also appeared in Coogan's live shows as compère Bernard Righton and the two would be reunited in the 2002 film 24 Hour Party People. The two won the Perrier Comedy Award in 1992 for their act at the Edinburgh Fringe.

Thomson also played supporting roles in the first series of the Stewart Lee and Richard Herring vehicle, Fist of Fun.

In 1994 Thomson appeared in the BBC sketch series The Fast Show, remaining with it until it ended in 2001. Thomson played memorable characters such as Chip Cobb, the deaf stuntman, and Roger the Nouveau football fan, but it is as "Jazz Club" host Louis Balfour that he is most remembered, with the catchphrase, "Nice!" He also appeared in The Fast Show Live and the spin-off Ted and Ralph.

In 1996 he appeared opposite Maureen Lipman as Bob Acres in The Rivals at the Royal Exchange, Manchester.

He made guest appearances on various series such as Coronation Street, Soldier Soldier and Men Behaving Badly in the 1990s before being cast as Pete Gifford in the ITV comedy drama Cold Feet. Thomson was known to the producers, who had previously cast him in a one-off drama called The Perfect Match. A series was commissioned that ran until 2003 and earned him a nomination for Best TV Comedy Actor at the British Comedy Awards 2001. Granada Television filmed a comedy drama called Stan the Man in 2002 in which Thomson starred as Stanley Tully a would-be entrepreneur. Some of the filming was done in south Manchester suburbs.

After Cold Feet wrapped, Thomson appeared in the Royal Exchange's production of Hobson's Choice (helped by his acclaimed performance in The Rivals). The Independent described his performance as Willie as "an extremely well-judged performance. With the slightest physical gesture and merest facial expression he conveys disbelief, reluctance, panic and finally acceptance of his fate at the hands of manipulative Maggie". His performance led to a Manchester Evening News Award nomination for Best Actor in a Leading Role.

That same year he participated in the BBC series Comic Relief does Fame Academy, being the fourth "student" to be "expelled". and in 2004, he appeared in the musical drama Blackpool as Tony Corlette.

He has also lent his voice to the revived BBC children's series Bill and Ben and Mr Windfall in Wallace & Gromit in The Curse of the Were-Rabbit. Another television series, New Street Law, about a Manchester chambers, started in 2006. Thomson plays "lovable rogue" barrister Charlie Darling alongside co-star John Hannah. The second series began in January 2007.

In February 2007 he played Sir Alan Prentice, in Kombat Opera Presents... The Applicants, a spoof opera of the BBC series The Apprentice. The programme attracted 700,000 viewers according to unofficial overnights. In March 2007 he appeared as hypnotherapist Ray Bould in the three-part ITV thriller, Mobile. The producers had Thomson lined up for the role of DI Fleming, but he wanted to read for Bould because he "was up against a friend for the same part". Later that year he filmed a guest appearance as Nigel Pearson in a second series episode of Kingdom. He returned as a full-time cast member for the third series.

In October 2008, Thomson filmed a three-episode guest stint on the ITV soap opera Coronation Street, playing electrician-cum-children's entertainer Jesse, which aired in December. In January 2009, it was announced that he would reprise the role for six months. Jesse returned to Coronation Street in June, beginning a relationship with Eileen Grimshaw (Sue Cleaver). He left 2010, after his contract was not renewed. Later that same year, he portrayed H.V. Kershaw in The Road to Coronation Street, a dramatisation of Coronation Streets development in the 1960s.

In 2011, Thomson joined the cast of the BBC television series Waterloo Road.

Later in 2011, it was announced that Thomson would be appearing next to the original cast (with the exception of Mark Williams) in six online-only episodes of The Fast Show sponsored by lager brand, Foster's due to launch on 10 November 2011.

In 2011, John was a contestant on the ITV celebrity reality series 71 Degrees North.

In 2015 he joined the cast of After Hours as loveable Geoff, reuniting with his old friends Craig Cash and Caroline Aherne, who played his wife Sheila. During filming Thomson was attacked by a swan on set, footage being shown on ITV's This Morning.

Thomson was a contestant in the 2013 series of Celebrity MasterChef. Since 2015, Thomson has starred in The Keith Lemon Sketch Show, playing various characters.

He narrates the Channel 4 series Obsessive Compulsive Cleaners and in September 2015, he became the new narrator of Police Interceptors. He stars in the Sky1 comedy drama After Hours, directed by Craig Cash.

From 2016, Thomson began narrating Channel 5 show 'Bargain Loving Brits in the Sun' - a show about British expats who have moved to Spain to begin a new life in the sun.

On 18 November 2017, Thomson was a contestant in the reboot of The Weakest Link for Children in Need.

In 2018, Thomson was a contestant in Dara O Briain's Go 8 Bit.

In 2019, he's currently a star of the comedy clip show, Zone of Champions.

In 2020, Thomson voiced the character of Dog in the Cbeebies show, Dog Loves Books.

In 2021, Thomson participated on the second series of The Masked Singer, masked as Bush Baby. He finished in 8th place.

In Dec 2022, Thomson landed the role of Abanazar in “Aladdin” starring alongside award-winning Best Dame Morgan Brind in the high-flying action-packed pantomime at Derby Arena.

Radio
In January 2008 he played Mike (Topaz) in the BBC Radio 4 comedy drama series Pick Ups. On 12 April 2008, Thomson began hosting the Saturday lunchtime slot on BBC Radio Manchester. His stint ended on 22 November 2008.

Since 2016, Thomson has been a team captain on the BBC Radio 4 panel show Gaby's Talking Pictures, presented by Gaby Roslin.

Personal life
Thomson married longtime girlfriend Samantha Sharp in 2005 and they have two daughters; Olivia (born 2002) and Sophia Melody (born 2010). They divorced in 2015.

Filmography
Film

Television

References

External links

1969 births
Alumni of Manchester Metropolitan University
British sketch comedians
Comedians from Lancashire
English adoptees
English male comedians
English male film actors
English male radio actors
English male stage actors
English male television actors
English male voice actors
English male writers
English Roman Catholics
English television writers
Living people
Actors from Preston, Lancashire
Entertainers from Preston, Lancashire
People from Walkden
The Fast Show
British male television writers